San Carlos is one of the 31 barangays of Valencia City, Bukidnon.
It is bounded by Lurogan in the west, Bagontaas, Mailag, and Colonia in the east,
Barobo in the south, and the Poblacion in the southeast.

References

Barangays of Valencia, Bukidnon